Myles and Lenny were a Canadian folk-pop music group based in Toronto, Ontario. most active during the 1970s.

History
Myles and Lenny was formed in 1969 by its principal members, guitarist Myles Cohen and pianist/violinist Lenny Solomon. By 1972 they had been signed to GRT Records. They released a single, "Time to Know Your Friends".  The group transferred to Columbia Records in 1974, and appeared on several television programs while continuing to perform live in small venues. The band released a self-titled record in 1975; the album included the Canadian Top 20 single "Can You Give it All to Me".

At the 1976 Juno Awards, the group won in the category of
Most Promising Group. However, disappointing sales of their second album led to the group's demise in the mid-1970s. Cohen and Solomon since released various separate music projects.

Discography

Albums
 1975: Myles and Lenny (Columbia)
 1975: It Isn't the Same (Columbia)

Singles
 1972: "Time to Know Your Friends"
 1974: "Can You Give it All to Me", RPM Magazine peak #19 February 1975
 1974: "Hold On Lovers",  #93 Canada, September 20, 1975 
 1975: "I Care Enough"

References

External links
 
 Lenny Solomon official site
 Myles Cohen official site
 

Canadian folk music groups
Juno Award for Breakthrough Group of the Year winners
Musical groups established in 1969
Musical groups disestablished in 1976
1969 establishments in Ontario
1976 disestablishments in Ontario